Baucau is a municipality, and was formerly a district, of East Timor, on the northern coast in the eastern part of the country. The capital is also called Baucau (formerly Vila Salazar). The population of the municipality is 111,694 (census 2010) and it has an area of 1,506 km².

Etymology
The word Baucau is derived from the word "Akau", which means "pig" in the local Waimoa language. During the Portuguese colonial era, the name of the district was transformed, first into Macau and finally into Baucau. An alternative name for the Baucau community is Wailia-Wailewa, meaning the "great water spring of Wai Lia". In the Wai Lia area (part of the suco of ), a large spring is located under large trees; it is both an animist and Christian holy place.

In 1936, the Portuguese colonial authorities renamed what was then the district of Baucau as "São Domingos". However, that name, like other imperial-sounding names adopted in the colony at about that time, did not catch on, and a few years after World War II it was quietly abandoned.

Geography

The borders of the District of Baucau during the colonial era were the same as they are now. The north edge of the municipality is to the Wetar Strait; it also borders the municipalities of Lautém to the east, Viqueque to the south, and Manatuto to the west.

Baucau also has a wide coastline with sandy beaches, ideal for swimming and other watersports.

In the administrative post of Venilale are tunnels that the Japanese built during their occupation during the Second World War. Also in this administrative post is an ongoing project to reconstruct and renovate the Escola do Reino de Venilale (School of the Kingdom of Venilale).

Administrative posts
The municipality's administrative posts (formerly sub-districts) are:
Baguia
Baucau
Laga
Quelicai
Vemasse
Venilale (formerly known as Vila Viçosa).

Demographics
Besides the national official languages of Tetum and Portuguese, most of the inhabitants speak the Papuan language Makasae. While most of the inhabitants are Roman Catholics, a few Muslims also live there.

Economy
Baucau has the most highly developed agriculture in East Timor. Besides the staples rice and corn, Baucau produces beans, peanuts, sweet potatoes, copra, candlenut and manioc. It also raises buffalo and goats. A shortage of transportation links and the unpredictability of energy availability stymie the development of emerging industries.

Infrastructure
Baucau has the country's longest airport runway, in Cakung Airport, as currently, Dili's Nicolau Lobato International Airport can only serve small airliners like the Boeing 737. The airport is located six km from the city of Baucau. It served as the country's principal airport before the Indonesian invasion in 1975, when it was taken over by the Indonesian military. Bucoli, a village with symbolic role in the East Timorese resistance movement, is located in the subdistrict of Baucau.

Notable people 

 Carlos Filipe Ximenes Belo
 Mário Viegas Carrascalão
 Aurélio Sérgio Cristóvão Guterres
 Olinda Guterres
 Vicente Guterres
 Maria Fernanda Lay
 Adaljiza Magno
 Mauk Moruk
 Taur Matan Ruak
 Aurora Ximenes
 Mariana Diaz Ximenez

References

Notes

Bibliography

External links 

  – official site (in Tetum with some content in English)
  – information page on Ministry of State Administration site 

 
Municipalities of East Timor